is a Japanese manga artist. After debuting in 2003, he launched Übel Blatt in the following year, which saw success internationally and won the Japan Expo Award in the seinen category in 2008. Starting in 2020, he did the illustrations for Deep Insanity: Nirvana.

Biography
Etorouji Shiono was born in Nagano Prefecture on September 16, 1976. In 2004, he launched Übel Blatt, which ran until 2015. The series did very well, especially in France where at one point it was ranked as one of the top 15 manga in the country. The series was also awarded the Japan Expo Award in 2008 in the seinen category. Starting in 2020, Shiono did the illustrations for Deep Insanity: Nirvana, a manga for Square Enix's Deep Insanity multimedia franchise.

Works
  (2003–2012) (serialized in Young King)
  (2003) (serialized in Magi-Cu)
  (2004–2019) (serialized in Young Gangan and Monthly Big Gangan) 
  (2010–2016) (serialized in Monthly Shōnen Sirius)
  (2012–2015) (serialized in Young King Ours GH)
  (2015–2017) (serialized in Young King Ours GH)
  (2017–2019) (serialized in Young King Ours GH)
 Deep Insanity: Nirvana (2020–present) (serialized in Monthly Big Gangan; story by Norimitsu Kaihō and Makoto Fukami)
  (2020–2021) (serialized in Young King Ours GH)

References

External links
 

1976 births
Living people
Manga artists from Nagano Prefecture